Nachamps is a commune in the Charente-Maritime department in the Nouvelle-Aquitaine region in southwestern France.

Population

Sights
The commune features certain rural characteristics, the church named Saint Nicolas, the fountain which recently renovated with the source of water from the mill.

See also
 Communes of the Charente-Maritime department

References

External links
 

Communes of Charente-Maritime
Charente-Maritime communes articles needing translation from French Wikipedia